Snap municipal elections were held in Rome on 5 and 19 June 2016, to elect the Mayor of Rome and 48 members of the City Council, as well as the fifteen presidents and more than 400 councillors of the 15 municipi in which the municipality is divided.

The elections were called following the fall of the former Mayor of Rome Ignazio Marino, who was ousted from office after more than half of the members of the City Council resigned in October 2015.

The first round of voting on 5 June produced no outright winner, resulting in a run-off election on 19 June between Virginia Raggi, the candidate of the Five Star Movement (M5S), and Roberto Giachetti, member of the Democratic Party (PD). Raggi won the mayoral election with two-thirds of the vote, and her party alone won a majority in the City Council of Rome with 29 of the 48 seats.

The results were widely reported as a major breakthrough for the Five Star Movement, which had previously been seen as a protest party rather than a significant political force. At the same round of elections, M5S also won Turin municipal elections.

Background
On 12 October 2015, the incumbent mayor Ignazio Marino announced his resignation amidst an accusation of expense scandal that had been made by some opposition parties (especially Five Star Movement and the right-wing Brothers of Italy), but on 29 October he retired the resignation. Nevertheless on 30 October he was ousted from his position after 26 of the 48 members of the City Council resigned. The mayorlater was replaced by a government-appointed commissioner and snap municipal elections were called.

Centre-left primary election
As in 2013, the centre-left coalition decided to hold the primary election on 6 March 2016 to decide its mayoral candidate. There were 6 main candidates, all from Democratic Party, since the left-wing parties decided to break the alliance and present their own mayoral candidate.

Among the most popular candidates there were deputies Roberto Giachetti and Roberto Morassut. More than 47,000 citizens took part to the primary election which was won by Giachetti:

M5S primary election
As it previously did in different occasion, also the Five Star Movement decided to hold a primary election to choose its mayoral candidate. Many candidates took part in the closed primary which was held online on 23 February 2016. Virginia Raggi, one of four members of the City Council elected for the M5S in 2013, won the primary with 45% of votes.

Voting system
The voting system is used for all mayoral elections in Italy, in the city with a population higher than 15,000 inhabitants. Under this system voters express a direct election for the mayor or an indirect election voting for the party of the candidate's coalition. If no candidate receives 50% of votes, the top two candidates go to a second round after two weeks. This gives a result whereby the winning candidate may be able to claim majority support, although it is not guaranteed.

The election of the City Council is based on a direct choice for the candidate with a preference vote: the candidate with the majority of the preferences is elected. The number of the seats for each party is determined proportionally.

Parties and candidates
This is a list of the parties (and their respective leaders) which participated in the election.

Opinion polling

Results

Municipi election

All the presidents were elected on the second round, since none obtained more than 50% of votes on the first round of voting. The president of Municipio X wasn't elected since the municipio was under the administration of a Special Commissioner nominated after the municipal council had been dissolved in 2015 due to mafia association.

Table below shows the results for each municipio with the percentage for each coalition on the second round:

Source: Municipality of Rome - Electoral Service

References

2016 elections in Italy
Rome
Rome
Elections in Rome
2010s in Rome
June 2016 events in Italy